Godspell (1971 Off-Broadway Cast) is the original cast recording of the Cherry Lane Theatre production of Godspell. It produced a radio hit in the summer of 1972 with "Day By Day" with Robin Lamont on the lead vocal. The image of the face on the album cover was designed by David Byrd.

Track listing
Music and new lyrics by Stephen Schwartz except as indicated.
 "Prepare Ye the Way of the Lord" – 2:03
 "Save the People" – 3:24
 "Day by Day" – 3:16
 "Learn Your Lessons Well" – 1:25
 "Bless the Lord" – 3:01
 "All for the Best" – 2:31
 "All Good Gifts" – 3:33
 "Light of the World" – 2:59
 "Turn Back, O Man" – 4:20
 "Alas for You" – 2:01
 "By My Side" (lyric by Jay Hamburger / music by Peggy Gordon) – 2:42
 "We Beseech Thee" – 3:37
 "On the Willows" – 3:07
 "Finale" – 5:40
 "Day By Day (Reprise)" – 1:56

Cast
Lamar Alford – piano, vocals
Peggy Gordon – guitar, vocals 
David Haskell – shofar, vocals
Joanne Jonas – vocals 
Robin Lamont – vocals 
Sonia Manzano – vocals 
Gilmer McCormick – guitar, vocals 
Jeffrey Mylett – guitar, concertina, recorder, vocals 
Stephen Nathan – ukulele, vocals 
Herb Braha – vocals

Band
Steve Reinhardt – keyboards
Jesse Cutler – acoustic and lead guitar, bass
Richard LaBonte – rhythm guitar, bass
Ricky Shutter – drums, percussion

Musical production personnel
David Byrd – design 
Stephen Schwartz – arranger, producer, musical director 
Charles Haid – associate producer 
John-Michael Tebelak – director, concept 
Beverly Weinstein – art direction

Recording personnel
Elvin Campbell – audio engineer
Bill Inglot – remastering 
Ken Perry – remastering

Charts

Certifications

References

Cast recordings
1971 soundtrack albums
Theatre soundtracks
Arista Records soundtracks
Bell Records soundtracks
Albums produced by Stephen Schwartz (composer)